

Teams
Each team that competes in the tournament will come out of one of the 10 regions.

Results

United States Bracket

International Bracket

See also
 2013 Intermediate League World Series

Intermediate League World Series
2013 in baseball